Bomassa is a town in the northern Republic of Congo, lying on the Sanga River and the border with the Central African Republic.  It is known for its local rainforests, home to a wide variety of large mammals.  There have been repeated calls for its immediate area to be designated a national park.

References

Populated places in the Republic of the Congo